Marie Hermanson (born 1956) is a Swedish writer and journalist. Many of her novels evoke fairy tales and myths, characterized by her sensually realist style. The Devil's Sanctuary, her first novel to be translated into English, appeared in 2013.

Biography
Born in Sävedalen, a suburb of Gothenburg, Hermanson attended the Gothenburg School of Journalism (Journalisthögskolan) before studying sociology and literature at Gothenburg University. She then worked for various newspapers until 1986 when she published Det finns ett hål i verkligheten (There is a Hole in Reality), evoking fairy tales and myths. Her novel Snövit (1990) provides her own interpretation of Snow White while in Tvillingsystrana (The Twin Sisters, 1993), Värddjuret (The Parasite's Host, 1995) and Musselstranden (The Mussel Shore, 1998), she adds sensuality to the fairly tale genre, drawing on the renewed interest in realism characterizing Nordic literature in the late 20th century.

Himmelsdalen (2011), her first novel to be translated into English, appeared as The Devil's Sanctuary in 2013. The thriller tells the story of estranged twin brothers who meet at an Alpine clinic.

Bibliography
Det finns ett hål i verkligheten, 1986
Snövit, 1990
Tvillingsystrarna, 1993
Värddjuret, 1995
Musselstranden, 1998
Ett oskrivet blad, 2001
Hembiträdet, 2004
Mannen under trappan, 2005
Svampkungens son, 2007
Himmelsdalen, 2011, translated as The Devil's Sanctuary, 2013
Skymningslandet, 2014
Den stora utställningen, 2018
Pestön, 2021

Awards 
 Partille Bookstore's Writer's Scholarship −1997
 Bokhandelns val – 2005

Nominations
August Prize – 1995 (for Värddjuret).

References

External links
Marie Hermanson's website, mainly in Swedish

1956 births
Living people
Swedish journalists
Swedish women writers
Swedish women novelists
People from Gothenburg